The 2019 BNP Paribas Open (also known as the 2019 Indian Wells Masters) was a professional tennis tournament played at Indian Wells, California in March 2019. It was the 46th edition of the men's event and 31st of the women's event, and was classified as an ATP Tour Masters 1000 event on the 2019 ATP Tour and a Premier Mandatory event on the 2019 WTA Tour. Both the men's and the women's events took place at the Indian Wells Tennis Garden in Indian Wells, California, from March 4 through March 17, 2019, on outdoor hard courts.

All top 75 ranked WTA and ATP Tour singles players were included in the initial entry list, but two-time champion Maria Sharapova announced her withdrawal three weeks before the tournament due to a right shoulder injury.

Juan Martín del Potro and Naomi Osaka were the defending champions in the men's and women's draw respectively. Del Potro withdrew before the tournament began due to a knee injury. Osaka lost in the fourth round to Belinda Bencic.

Points and prize money

Point distribution

 Players with byes receive first-round points.

Prize money

ATP singles main-draw entrants

Seeds

The following are the seeded players. Rankings and seedings are based on ATP rankings as of March 4, 2019.

† The player did not qualify for the tournament in 2018, but was defending points from an ATP Challenger Tour tournament.

Withdrawals

Other entrants
The following players received wildcards into the singles main draw:
  Félix Auger-Aliassime
  Laslo Đere
  Jared Donaldson
  Reilly Opelka
  Donald Young

The following players received entry from the qualifying draw:
  Radu Albot
  Alex Bolt
  Dan Evans
  Bjorn Fratangelo
  Marcos Giron
  Prajnesh Gunneswaran
  Ugo Humbert
  Denis Istomin
  Tatsuma Ito
  Filip Krajinović
  Alexei Popyrin
  Elias Ymer

The following players received entry as lucky losers:
  Ričardas Berankis
  Miomir Kecmanović
  Andrey Rublev

Withdrawals
Before the tournament
  Kevin Anderson → replaced by  Miomir Kecmanović
  Aljaž Bedene → replaced by  Ryan Harrison
  Pablo Carreño Busta → replaced by  Andrey Rublev
  Chung Hyeon → replaced by  Ilya Ivashka
  Juan Martín del Potro → replaced by  Taro Daniel
  Grigor Dimitrov → replaced by  Ričardas Berankis
  Richard Gasquet → replaced by  Federico Delbonis
  Vasek Pospisil → replaced by  Mackenzie McDonald
  Fernando Verdasco → replaced by  Ernests Gulbis

During the tournament
  Gaël Monfils
  Rafael Nadal

Retirements
  Martin Kližan
  Yoshihito Nishioka

ATP doubles main-draw entrants

Seeds 

1 Rankings as of March 4, 2019.

Other entrants
The following pairs received wildcards into the doubles main draw:
  Taylor Fritz /  Nick Kyrgios
  Mackenzie McDonald /  Reilly Opelka
  Lucas Pouille /  Stan Wawrinka

The following pair received entry as alternates:
  Adrian Mannarino /  Gaël Monfils

Withdrawals
  Pablo Carreño Busta (shoulder injury)

WTA singles main-draw entrants

Seeds
The following are the seeded players. Seedings are based on WTA rankings as of February 25, 2019. Rankings and points before are as of March 4, 2019.

Withdrawals

Other entrants
The following players received wildcards into the singles main draw:
  Bianca Andreescu
  Amanda Anisimova
  Jennifer Brady
  Madison Brengle
  Lauren Davis
  Jessica Pegula
  Taylor Townsend
  Sachia Vickery

The following player received entry using a protected ranking into the singles main draw:
  Laura Siegemund

The following players received entry from the qualifying draw:
  Ysaline Bonaventure
  Zarina Diyas
  Misaki Doi
  Viktorija Golubic
  Nao Hibino
  Priscilla Hon
  Kateryna Kozlova
  Christina McHale
  Caty McNally
  Natalia Vikhlyantseva
  Stefanie Vögele
  Zhu Lin

Withdrawals
Before the tournament
  Camila Giorgi → replaced by  Eugenie Bouchard
  Luksika Kumkhum → replaced by  Magda Linette
  Ekaterina Makarova → replaced by  Johanna Larsson
  Maria Sharapova (right shoulder injury) → replaced by  Mona Barthel

Retirements
  Anastasija Sevastova (viral illness)
  Serena Williams (viral illness)

WTA doubles main-draw entrants

Seeds 

1 Rankings as of February 25, 2019.

Other entrants
The following pairs received wildcards into the doubles main draw:
  Victoria Azarenka /  Elina Svitolina
  Eugenie Bouchard /  Sloane Stephens
  Serena Williams /  Venus Williams (Withdrew to focus on singles)

The following pairs received entry as alternates:
  Garbiñe Muguruza /  Carla Suárez Navarro
  Anastasia Pavlyuchenkova /  Anastasija Sevastova

Withdrawals
 Before the tournament
  Serena Williams (change of schedule)
  Venus Williams (change of schedule)
  Vera Zvonareva

 During the tournament
  Carla Suárez Navarro (hip injury)

Champions

Men's singles

  Dominic Thiem def.  Roger Federer, 3–6, 6–3, 7–5

Women's singles

  Bianca Andreescu def.  Angelique Kerber, 6–4, 3–6, 6–4

Men's doubles

  Nikola Mektić /  Horacio Zeballos def.  Łukasz Kubot /  Marcelo Melo, 4–6, 6–4, [10–3]

Women's doubles

  Elise Mertens /  Aryna Sabalenka def.  Barbora Krejčíková /  Kateřina Siniaková, 6–3, 6–2

References

External links

 
2018 BNP Paribas Open
2019 ATP Tour
2019 WTA Tour
2019 in American tennis
March 2019 sports events in the United States
2019 in sports in California